Thomas Humphrey (16 January 1839 – 3 September 1878) was an English cricketer who played first-class cricket for Surrey between 1862 and 1874. 

A right-hand batsman and a round arm right-armed slow bowler, he featured as an all-rounder for Surrey with four centuries and 116 wickets (though his batting was more significant than his bowling). He was a member of the Surrey side that was generally reckoned as Champion County for 1864. His best season with the bat was 1865, when he reached one thousand runs for the only time: 1223 at 29.82.

After 1873, he played in only four more first-class matches: one final match for Surrey in 1874, two for the South against the North in 1875, and lastly for United South of England Eleven v United North of England Eleven in a match that began on 13 July 1876.

According to David Lemmon, with Harry Jupp he formed the first great opening partnership for Surrey, one which caused "a sensation" with "their bright and attractive cricket, their long partnerships, by their speed between the wickets." 

He was known as the Pocket Hercules, because although short he could hit powerfully. He was particularly strong on the off-side, and appeared to have plenty of time to play his shots.

He umpired in a number of first-class matches between 1872 and 1877, including some Gentlemen v Players and North v South matches. In 1876, a benefit year at Surrey brought him £300, however he died two years later from congestion of the lungs in Brookwood Asylum. His brothers John, William and Richard also played first-class cricket.

He was the landlord of the Cricketers Inn at Westcott and the Ram Inn and the Jolly Butchers Inn, both in Dorking.

He is buried in Brookwood Cemetery.

Notes

External links
 
 

1839 births
1878 deaths
People from Mitcham
English cricketers
Surrey cricketers
Players cricketers
All-England Eleven cricketers
North v South cricketers
United South of England Eleven cricketers
English cricket umpires
Southgate cricketers
Surrey Club cricketers
North of the Thames v South of the Thames cricketers
Burials at Brookwood Cemetery
Players of the South cricketers
Players of Surrey cricketers
New All England Eleven cricketers
Deaths in mental institutions